Mexico–Turkey relations are foreign relations between Mexico and Turkey. Both nations are members of the OECD and the United Nations.

Country comparison

History 

The first official contact between Mexico and the Ottoman Empire (present day Turkey) was 1864 when Emperor Maximilian I of Mexico sent out emissaries to several nations to seek official recognition of his rule in the country. Diplomatic relations between the two nations were established in 1928 after the transformation of Turkey from the Ottoman Empire by Mustafa Kemal Atatürk, founder of the modern Turkish republic in 1923; and after the end of the Mexican revolution in 1920. That same year, both nations signed a 'Friendship Agreement'. Almost immediately, both nations opened diplomatic legations in each other's capitals, respectively. 

The diplomat Hasan Tahsin Mayatepek laid the foundation for Mexican–Turkish relations during the 1930s, and had a great influence in the way Mexico, and its indigenous peoples like the Aztecs and Maya peoples are seen in Turkey. The Turkish Embassy in Mexico City opened in 1947. In 1962, their respective diplomatic missions were upgraded to embassies.

In June 1992, Mexican Foreign Secretary Fernando Solana paid an official visit to Turkey, becoming at the time the highest level government official to visit the country. While in Turkey, Secretary Solana and his counterpart, Foreign Minister Süleyman Demirel signed agreements on cultural exchanges and of eliminating visa requirements for diplomatic passport holders of both nations. The two nations also agreed to establish a mechanism for political consultations to discuss points of views on bilateral and multilateral mutual interests. In 1998, Prime Minister Mesut Yılmaz became the first Turkish head-of-state to pay an official visit to Mexico. In 2009, then Prime Minister Recep Tayyip Erdoğan paid a visit to Mexico. In 2013, President Enrique Peña Nieto became the first Mexican head-of-state pay a visit to Turkey.

Both nations are considered as regional powers and are playing bigger roles in the international community. Both nations have supported each other diplomatically, particularly in the United Nations and Mexico has supported Turkey over the issue of the Syrian Civil War occurring on its border. In 2013, Mexico donated US$1 million to Turkey for the support of over one million Syrian refugees that are currently being housed in the country. In July 2018, both nations celebrated 90 years of diplomatic relations.

In November 2022, Mexican Foreign Minister Marcelo Ebrard paid a visit to Turkey and met with his counterpart Mevlüt Çavuşoğlu. During the visit, both nations initiated discussions of a free trade agreement between them.

High-level Visits

High-level visits from Mexico to Turkey

 Foreign Minister Fernando Solana (1992)
 President Enrique Peña Nieto (2013, 2015)
 Foreign Minister Marcelo Ebrard (2022)

High-level visits from Turkey to Mexico

 Prime Minister Mesut Yılmaz (1998)
 Prime Minister and President Recep Tayyip Erdoğan (2009, 2012, 2015)
 Foreign Minister Mevlüt Çavuşoğlu (2017)

Bilateral agreements
Both nations have signed several bilateral agreements, such as a Friendship Agreement (1928); Agreements on Cultural Exchanges (1992); Agreement on Eliminating Visa requirements for Diplomatic Passport holders (1992); Memorandum of Understanding for the Establishment of a Mechanism of Consultation in Matters of Mutual Interest (2013); Agreement on the avoidance of Double-Taxation and Tax Evasion (2013); Customs Agreement (2013); Agreement on Air Transportation (2013); Agreement on the Protection of Investments (2013); Agreement of Cooperation in Combating against Illicit Trafficking in Narcotic Drugs and Psychotropic Substances (2013); Agreement of Cooperation in Combating Organized Crime and Terrorism (2013) and an Agreement in Science and Technical Cooperation (2013).

Transportation
There are direct flight between both nations with Turkish Airlines.

Trade
In 2018, trade between both nations amounted to US$1.2 billion. Mexico's main exports to Turkey include: wheat, telephones and vehicles. Turkey's exports to Mexico include: textiles, copper and aluminum-based products. Mexican multinational companies such as Cemex, Gruma and Zinc Nacional operate in Turkey and have invested over US$600 million in the country. Turkish multinational companies such as Orphan Holding, Tekno Kauch and Toto Max operate in Mexico.

Resident diplomatic missions 
 Mexico has an embassy in Ankara and a consulate in Istanbul.
 Turkey has an embassy in Mexico City.

See also 
 Turks in Mexico

References 

 
Turkey
Bilateral relations of Turkey